Samuel Joshua Stockley (born 5 September 1977) is an English football coach and former professional player who is now the first-team manager and sporting director at USL League One club Lexington SC.

A youth player at Southampton, he made his name at Barnet in the late 1990s, where he was named as Player of the Year in 2001. A short time at Oxford United was followed with a four-year spell with Colchester United between 2002 and 2006. After helping Colchester to win promotion out of League One in 2005–06, he then spent two seasons with Wycombe Wanderers, before signing with Port Vale in May 2008. He announced his retirement as a professional player in November 2009. However he returned to the game in 2010 with Hungarian side Ferencvárosi TC, before becoming a non-league player in England with Droylsden via Telford United in 2011. He spent 2011 at American club F.C. New York, before joining Carolina RailHawks a year later. Over the course of his 17-year professional career he made 583 appearances in all competitions, scoring six goals.

Following his retirement he would spend seven years coaching youth players and girls in the United States, returning to the United Kingdom in 2020 to coach at Llandudno before returning to the U.S. in 2021 as Sporting Director for Lexington SC.

Playing career

Barnet
Stockley began his career as a trainee at Southampton but was unable to break into the first team. He moved to Third Division outfit Barnet during the 1996–97 season, making his debut under Terry Bullivant in a 3–0 defeat by Swansea City at Vetch Field on 14 January. He played a further 20 league games that season, before making a total of 49 appearances in league and cup in 1997–98. He continued to be an almost constant presence at Underhill under John Still in 1998–99 and 1999–2000, making 45 and 39 appearances respectively, and scoring his first league goal in a 3–1 win over Hull City at Boothferry Park on 24 April 2000. He played 52 games for new boss Tony Cottee in 2000–01, scoring his second senior goal on 19 August in a 3–3 home draw with Mansfield Town. He was also named as the club's Player of the Year for 2001, and also picked up the club's 'Most Improved Player' award. Having played 209 games for the "Bees", he was sold on to Oxford United for a fee of £150,000 in July 2001 after becoming dissatisfied with his wages at Barnet.

Oxford to Colchester United
He played 44 games for Oxford under Mark Wright and Ian Atkins in 2001–02 as the "Yellows" struggled to retain their Football League status. He was loaned out to Second Division Colchester United at the start of the 2002–03 season, then managed by Steve Whitton, before moving permanently on a free transfer in October 2002. He scored his third ever goal on 29 October, in a 1–1 draw with Barnsley at Layer Road, and finished the campaign with 35 appearances to his name. He signed a new contract for Phil Parkinson's side after he missed just two of United's 60 matches in the 2003–04 season. He played 44 games in 2004–05, scoring on the opening day of the season with a "stunning strike" from 25 yards in a 3–0 win over Sheffield Wednesday at Hillsborough in League One. He played 34 games for the "U's" in the promotion season of 2005–06, scoring his fifth career goal from 25 yards in a 3–1 defeat to Southend United at Roots Hall on 29 August. He joined Blackpool on loan in March 2006, featuring seven times for Simon Grayson's "Seasiders".

Wycombe Wanderers
After his release from Colchester following 171 appearances for the club, Stockley moved to Paul Lambert's Wycombe Wanderers of League Two in July 2006. He spent the 2006–07 season as the club's regular right-back, but also filled in as centre-back and sweeper during tactical changes. He played a total of 42 times, scoring his sixth and final league goal at London Road in a 3–3 draw with Peterborough United on 31 March. He lost his place at right-back to Russell Martin in the 2007–08 season, but was used as a left-back on many occasions, featuring 23 times throughout the campaign. In February 2008, he had a trial with American club FC Dallas.

Port Vale
Stockley left Wycombe and signed for Port Vale in May 2008, signing a two-year deal. He was appointed as captain in July of that year by manager Lee Sinnott. By mid-season Stockley found himself regularly on the Vale bench under new boss Dean Glover, but said "I think that Port Vale haven't seen the best of me yet, but I believe they will because I'm really happy here". He managed to battle his way back into the first team and win back his captaincy (from Marc Richards) during the latter part of the 2008–09 season. Stockley admitted that at times in the season he had considered retirement, but after winning back his first team spot he said he was enjoying his football.

He renegotiated his contract in August 2009 in order to gain more first team football in the 2009–10 season; a clause that entitled Stockley to a 12-month contract extension after fifty games was removed. He started the season fighting with new signing Adam Yates for a regular place, but was transfer-listed in late September, along with the entire Port Vale squad, after manager Micky Adams saw his team slip to a third consecutive defeat. After twelve appearances in the campaign, the defender shocked Vale fans by announcing his retirement in November 2009, at the age of 32. He took the decision to retire on medical advice, having suffered an eye injury.

Later career

In January 2010 he came out of retirement to sign with Hungarian club Ferencvárosi TC in a coaching capacity, then managed by Craig Short. He played 15 Nemzeti Bajnokság I (top flight) games in 2009–10, also featuring four times in 2010–11 under László Prukner.

In January 2011, he joined Conference North club Telford United. However, without making a single first team appearance for the "Bucks", Stockley signed for league rivals Droylsden the following month – to the frustration of Telford manager Andy Sinton. Later in the year he travelled to the US to sign with F.C. New York of the newly formed USL Pro (third tier). They fared poorly in 2011, not reaching the play-offs having finished fifth in the six team division. Professional football did not return to the Belson Stadium in 2012, as the club did not enter a league competition. In April 2012, Stockley signed for the Carolina RailHawks of the North American Soccer League for the 2012 season.

Coaching career
Stockley had helped to coach the academy at Wycombe Wanderers, Port Vale and Ferencvárosi, but got his first full-time coaching role as Director of Raleigh at Triangle Futbol Club from 2012 to 2014. He spent 2013 to 2017 as assistant first-team coach at Carolina RailHawks, and also coached girls' football for the North Carolina FC Youth. In January 2017, he was recruited to the Xavier Musketeers coaching staff by Kacey White. Eight months later he was appointed as the new Girls' Technical Director and Associate Girls' Development Academy Director at the West Florida Flames. He later went on to scout for the United States national soccer team. He was appointed head of coaching at Cymru North club Llandudno in August 2020.

Lexington SC
In October 2021, Stockley was announced as the Sporting Director for Lexington Sporting Club which will compete in third-division professional American soccer league USL League One in the regular 2023 season. On 13 October 2022, Lexington named Stockley first-team manager.

Personal life
Stockley completed his coaching badges at 'C' level with the intention to go into management. He studied broadcast journalism at Staffordshire University during his time at Port Vale, hoping to pursue a career in the media upon his retirement as a player, specifically as a pitch-side reporter. During his time at Wycombe Wanderers he also had his own column in the club programme. He met his wife, Anna, in 2004 and has two children: Esmé and Jobe.

Career statistics

Honours
Individual
Barnet F.C. Player of the Year: 2001

Colchester United
League One second-place promotion: 2005–06

References

1977 births
Living people
Sportspeople from Tiverton, Devon
English footballers
Association football defenders
Barnet F.C. players
Oxford United F.C. players
Colchester United F.C. players
Blackpool F.C. players
Wycombe Wanderers F.C. players
Port Vale F.C. players
English expatriate footballers
Expatriate footballers in Hungary
Ferencvárosi TC footballers
AFC Telford United players
Droylsden F.C. players
English expatriate sportspeople in the United States
Expatriate soccer players in the United States
F.C. New York players
North Carolina FC players
English Football League players
USL Championship players
North American Soccer League players
Nemzeti Bajnokság I players
Alumni of Staffordshire University
English expatriate football managers
Expatriate soccer managers in the United States
Association football coaches
USL League One coaches
Wycombe Wanderers F.C. non-playing staff
Port Vale F.C. non-playing staff